Michael Feinstein Sings the Jerry Herman Songbook is a 1993 album by American vocalist Michael Feinstein of songs written by Jerry Herman.

Reception

The Allmusic review by William Ruhlmann awarded the album four stars and said the album is "a recital-like quality. It also has a cabaret-like quality...he demonstrates that Herman has had an amazing facility for writing catchy uptempo material and heart-rending ballads, no matter what show they happened to have been intended for".

Track listing
 "Just Go to the Movies" - 3:32
 "As Simple as That" - 3:11
 Hello, Dolly! Medley
 "Put on Your Sunday Clothes" - 1:09
 "It Only Takes a Moment" - 1:34
 "Before the Parade Passes By" - 2:01
 "Penny in My Pocket" - 3:22
 "Kiss Her Now" - 3:02
 "With You on My Arm" - 2:18
 "Marianne" - 3:01
 "Mame" - 3:51
 "Dancing" - 2:28
 "Let's Not Waste a Moment" - 4:13
 "Loving You" - 3:17
 "Look Over There" - 2:25
 "To Be Alone with You" - 3:49
 Mame Medley
 "It's Today" - 1:01
 "If She Walked into My Life" - 3:15
 "We Need a Little Christmas" - 1:09
 "It's Today (Reprise)" - 0:35
 "I Won't Send Roses" - 3:05
 "Hello, Dolly!" - 3:20
 "You I Like" - 2:45

All songs written by Jerry Herman.

Personnel
Michael Feinstein - vocals, piano
Jerry Herman - piano

References

Elektra Records albums
Michael Feinstein albums
1993 albums